The Men's 50 metre backstroke competition at the 2022 World Aquatics Championships was held on 24 and 25 June 2022.

Records
Prior to the competition, the existing world and championship records were as follows.

Results

Heats
The heats were started on 24 June at 09:23.

Semifinals
The semifinals were started on 24 June at 19:09.

Final
The final was held on 25 June at 18:02.

References

Men's 50 metre backstroke